Chesnut House (built 1812) was a landmark home in Todd County, Kentucky.

The site was the home of John P. Brown, a statesman from North Carolina who was a pioneer in Todd County. Brown lived on the plantation for two years before moving to what is now known as the Penchem region of Todd County. He sold his land to T. Foster in 1811. Foster built a large two-story log home on the land near a small creek known as "Reins Lick Creek" The house was symmetrical with a center dogtrot and kitchen to the right of the house. Foster set two rows of sugar maple trees along the approach road to the house, known as an alle'. Foster sold the plantation to William Chesnut circa 1840. William Chesnut was a prominent farmer and made alterations to the large cabin, covering it in weatherboard siding and adding verandas to the front and rear facades. He was a member of the Masonic Fraternity and attended the Cumberland Presbyterian Church. The plantation featured 21 auxiliary buildings.

The property remained in the Chesnut family until 1989 when it was thereafter sold to the Shanklin Family. Remaining on the property today are 3 of the 21 original auxiliary buildings, including a stable, hay shed, & tobacco barn. A modern home stands on the site adjacent to where the original plantation house stood. A cemetery known as the Foster/Chesnut Cemetery is located on the property.

References

Houses in Todd County, Kentucky
Dogtrot architecture in Kentucky
Houses completed in 1812
Demolished buildings and structures in Kentucky